Ian MacDonald is a Canadian architect. He studied architecture at the University of Waterloo and graduated in 1978 from Carleton University. He worked for Ronald Thom at the Thom Partnership', where he developed a foundation for his own approach to site, structure and the importance of landscape in architecture. In 1984 he established the firm of Ian MacDonald Architect, best known for its residential projects.

In addition to practicing architecture, MacDonald has taught at the University of Toronto, John H. Daniels Faculty of Architecture, Landscape and Design between 1984 and 2000, and has lectured nationally and internationally.

Selected awards

Ian MacDonald Architect Inc. has garnered 6 Canadian Architect Awards of Excellence  (1986–2005), 3 Governor General's Awards of Architecture  (2002, 2004, 2008) and the Ontario Association of Architects Design Excellence Award  (2010)
 2010: Ontario Association of Architects Design Excellence Award, House of Grey Highlands 
 2008: Governor General Medal for Architecture, 4a Wychwood Park 
 2005: Canadian Architect – Award of Excellence, House in Grey Highlands 
 2004: Governor General Medal for Architecture, House in Erin Township
 2003: Canadian Wood Council – Wood Design Residential Award, House in Mulmur Hills 
 2002: Governor General Medal for Architecture, House in Mulmur Hills #1 
 2002: Toronto Dominion Centre and Cadillac Fairview Corporation: Salute to the City, for Excellence in Design and Contributing to the City
 2001: Ontario Association of Architects – Architectural Excellence Award, House in Mulmur Hills 
 1999: Canadian Architect – Award of Excellence, Deacon/Kravis Residence 
 1997: Canadian Architect – Award of Excellence, House in Mulmur Hills 
 1995: Canadian Architect – Award of Excellence, 4a Wychwood Park 
 1994: Canadian Architect – Award of Excellence, 1 MacKenzie Crescent 
 1986: Canadian Architect – Award of Excellence, Lytle Residence

Selected projects
 House in Caledon
 Deer Park Residence
 House in Grey Highlands
 House in Collingwood
 Sidney Smith Hall, University of Toronto
 The Boulevard Club
 House on Farnham Avenue
 House in Midtown Toronto
 House at 4a Wychwood Park
 House in Erin Township
 House in Mulmur Hills #1
 House in Mulmur Hills #2
 Graham Residence

Sources 
 "Architecture Canada 2002: The Governor General's Medals in Architecture", Tuns Press, 2002 
 Andrew Gruft, "Substance over spectacle: Contemporary Canadian Architecture", Arsenal Pulp Press, 2005
 Leslie Jen, "View Master", Canadian Architect, 2008 
 "Architecture Canada 2008: The Governor General's Medals in Architecture", RAIC, 2008 
 John Bentley-Mays, "Going the distance", Canadian Architect, 2011

References

External links 
 Ian Macdonald Architect Inc. (official website)
 "Ian MacDonald" by Geoffrey Simmons (The Canadian Encyclopedia)

Living people
1953 births
Canadian architects
People from Kitchener, Ontario
University of Waterloo alumni
Carleton University alumni
Academic staff of the University of Toronto